The 2019 Irish local elections were held in all local authorities in Ireland on Friday, 24 May 2019, on the same day as the 2019 European Parliament election and a referendum easing restrictions on divorce. Each local government area is divided into local electoral areas (LEAs) where three to seven councillors are elected on the system of proportional representation by means of the single transferable vote.

Administrative boundary changes
There was one change to the local government areas since the 2014 elections, with a transfer of land from County Cork to Cork city under the Local Government Act 2019.

Reviews of the county boundaries near Drogheda, Athlone, and Carlow (Graiguecullen) recommended no change. A review recommending transfer of Ferrybank from Kilkenny County Council to Waterford City and County Council was rejected by minister Simon Coveney after objections from Kilkenny.

Two Local Electoral Area Boundary Committees were established in 2017 under the Local Government Reform Act 2014 and reported on 13 June 2018. The government accepted all recommendations and the boundaries of municipal districts and LEAs were consequently revised by statutory instruments signed on 19 December 2018 by John Paul Phelan, Minister of State at the Department of Housing, Planning and Local Government. In 2014, most districts had a single LEA and all LEAs (except for Cork city) had between 6 and 10 councillors, whereas from 2019 LEAs had between 3 and 7 councillors and some large municipal districts on the west coast had two LEAs to account for the greater distances involved for elected representatives.

Under the 2014 Act, the municipal districts containing the area of the former borough councils of Clonmel, Drogheda, Sligo and Wexford are designated as borough districts. The Boundary Committee proposed also designating census towns over 30,000 as borough districts, which would include the towns of Bray, Navan and Dundalk. A change to this designation was made by statutory instrument but was later reversed as incompatible with the 2014 act.

Mayoral plebiscites
Plebiscites took place in Cork City Council, Limerick City and County Council and Waterford City and County Council on whether to create the office of directly-elected mayors with executive functions who will act as an  member and chair of the council. These plebiscites were held under Part 6 of the Local Government Act 2019. The proposal was approved in Limerick City and County and rejected in both Cork City and Waterford City and County.

Election timetable
The elections were held in accordance with the Local Elections Regulations 1995 as amended. Relevant dates are as follows:
 25 March: Ministerial order fixing the election date was made by Eoghan Murphy, the Minister for Housing, Planning and Local Government.
 30 March: Election spending audit period begins.
 24 April: Posters may be put up in public.
 27 April: Opening (10am) of period of formal nomination of candidates to returning officer of each local authority. Political parties will in general have selected candidates for nomination in advance of this date.
 28 April: Last date for addition to the postal and special voters lists.
 4 May: Nominations close (midday).
 7 May: Last date for addition to the supplementary electoral register.
 23 May: Polling day on offshore islands. Broadcasting Authority of Ireland moratorium on campaign coverage starts at 2pm.
 24 May: Polling day (7 a.m. – 10 p.m.). Election spending audit period ends.
 25 May: Counting of votes begins.
 31 May: Newly elected councillors take office. Posters must be removed by this date to avoid constituting an offence of littering.
 7 June: First meeting of the new councils.

Campaign
Fine Gael head office issued a pre-election circular to its candidates on strategy for negotiating post-election power-sharing deals with other parties or groups. It prohibits deals with Sinn Féin, except where a council shares power across all groups (typically via D'Hondt method allocation of posts).

Garda inquiries were launched in relation to an unusually large number of postal vote applications in the Ballymote–Tubbercurry LEA, and alleged irregularities around 200 names added to the supplementary electoral register in the Killarney LEA.

Ellie Kisyombe, a Malawi-born refugee running for the Social Democrats in Dublin's North Inner City LEA, was retained after a review of inconsistencies in her account of her asylum history and time in Direct Provision, which caused several party members to resign in protest. The principal of Cadamstown national school in County Kildare was criticised for a letter to parents praising Fianna Fáil councillors over those of Fine Gael in dealing with the school.

Taoiseach Leo Varadkar stated after the poll that news of a personal injury claim taken by Fine Gael TD Maria Bailey in the week preceding the elections had caused reputational damage to Fine Gael.

Opinion polls

Results by party
Republican Sinn Féin and Independent Left are not registered parties; therefore their candidates appear on the ballot as Non-Party.

People Before Profit and Solidarity candidates ran under the electoral alliance Solidarity–People Before Profit.

Results by council

See also
2019 European Parliament election in Ireland
2019 Northern Ireland local elections
Next Irish general election

Footnotes

References

External links
 2019 Local Elections ElectionsIreland.org
 Adrian Kavanagh: Irish Elections: Geography, Facts and Analyses

 
Ireland
Council elections in the Republic of Ireland
May 2019 events in Ireland